The Comic Strip Classics series of commemorative postage stamps was issued by the US Postal Service on October 1, 1995, to honor the centennial of the newspaper comic strip. The 20 stamps all are listed in the Scott catalogue as No. 3000 for a pane and 3000a through 3000t for the individual stamps.

Restricted to strips created before 1950, the series featured drawings of comic-strip characters with their logos. The stamps were arranged in five tiers with four stamps to a tier. The featured strips are listed here in the sequence as published:

 The Yellow Kid
 The Katzenjammer Kids
 Little Nemo in Slumberland
 Bringing Up Father
 Krazy Kat
 Rube Goldberg’s Inventions
 Toonerville Folks
 Gasoline Alley
 Barney Google
 Little Orphan Annie
 Popeye
 Blondie
 Dick Tracy
 Alley Oop
 Nancy
 Flash Gordon
 Li'l Abner
 Terry and the Pirates
 Prince Valiant
 Brenda Starr, Reporter

References

External links
Stamp Sheet

1995 works
1995 in comics
Postage stamps of the United States
Works based on comics
Little Orphan Annie